The 1950 National Challenge Cup was the 36th edition of the United States Soccer Football Association's annual open cup. Today, the tournament is known as the Lamar Hunt U.S. Open Cup. Teams from the American Soccer League II competed in the tournament, based on qualification methods in their base region. St. Louis Simpkins-Ford won the tournament for their second time, by defeating Ponta Delgada S.C. of Fall River, Massachusetts.

Bracket

External links 
 1950 National Challenge Cup results – TheCup.us

Lamar Hunt U.S. Open Cup
U.S. Open Cup